Katak (also Romanized as Kotok) is a village in Lar Rural District, Laran District, Shahrekord County, Chaharmahal and Bakhtiari Province, Iran, located about  north west of Shahrekord County. At the 2006 census, its population was 201, in 49 families. The village is populated by Persians.

References 

Populated places in Shahr-e Kord County